Keraudrenia hillii is a shrub of the family Malvaceae native to New South Wales and Queensland in eastern Australia.

References

hillii
Plants described in 1863
Flora of New South Wales
Flora of Queensland
Taxa named by Ferdinand von Mueller
Taxa named  by George Bentham